Samsun 19 Mayıs Stadium, also known as Canik 19 Mayıs Stadium, ( or Canik 19 Mayıs Stadyumu) was a multi-purpose stadium in the Canik district of Samsun, northern Turkey.  It was used mostly for football matches and was the home ground of Samsunspor until the new Samsun Stadium was opened in 2017. The stadium had a seating capacity for 19,720 spectators. It was demolished in 2018.

The stadium was named in remembrance of the landing of Mustafa Kemal Pasha (1881–1938) in Samsun on May 19, 1919, to start the national independence movement.

Renovation
In 2006 the Black Sea club decided to renovate the ground. The capacity was increased by several thousand by adding a second tier to the "marathon side", and all the seats were covered with a roof. Now the all-covered, all-seated stadium has a capacity of 19,720.

International events hosted

The venue went onto host the football events of the 2017 Summer Deaflympics.

References

External links
Samsunspor official site - pictures and information regarding the renovation
Venue information

Football venues in Turkey
Multi-purpose stadiums in Turkey
Sports venues in Samsun
Sports venues completed in 1965
1965 establishments in Turkey
Samsunspor
Canik